The Monument of Glory (Monument slavy) is the focal point of Slavy Square in Samara (former Kuybyshev), Russia, overlooking the Volga river to the north-west. It is dedicated to the Kuybyshev workers of aircraft industry, who were working hard during and following the Great Patriotic War. The monument is one of the most prominent symbols of Samara. Moscow sculptors Pavel Bondarenko, Oleg Kiryuhin and architect A. Samsonov created a design of the thirteen-meter-tall figure, made from high alloy steel with wings raised over his head and forty-meter pedestal. The pedestal symbolizes ray of light rising to the sky.

The monument was erected between 1968 and 1971 for donations of Kuybyshev workers and other staff members of production plants. Every worker could donate only one rouble. Kuybyshev mayor's office chose a place for the monument in the city centre in the Leninsky district. The opening ceremony took place on 5 November 1971.

Historical background 
Kuybyshev was major aircraft-industry center of the Soviet Union during the Second World War. 28,000 Ilyushin Il-2 and Ilyushin Il-10 ground-attack aircraft was made in Kuybyshev's factories No. 1 and No. 18., representing 80 per cent of inventory.

References 

Monuments and memorials built in the Soviet Union
World War II memorials in Russia
1971 sculptures
Statues in Russia
Tourist attractions in Samara Oblast
Buildings and structures in Samara, Russia
Monuments and memorials in Samara Oblast
Cultural heritage monuments of regional significance in Samara Oblast